George Leslie "Bunny" Grant (29 September 1940 – 1 November 2018) was a Jamaican professional feather/super feather/light/light welter/welterweight/light middleweight boxer of the 1950s, '60s and '70s who won the Jamaican lightweight title, Jamaican welterweight title, Central American light welterweight Title, Latin American junior welterweight title, and British Commonwealth lightweight title, and was a challenger for the World Boxing Council (WBC) light welterweight title and World Boxing Association (WBA) World light welterweight title against Eddie Perkins, Commonwealth welterweight title against Clyde Gray, his professional fighting weight varied from , i.e. featherweight to , i.e. light middleweight. Bunny Grant was managed by Jacques Deschamps, and Pancho Rankine (circa 1962), and trained by Harry Wiley (circa 1962). He died on 1 November 2018.

References

External links
 
 Image – Bunny Grant

1940 births
2018 deaths
Featherweight boxers
Light-middleweight boxers
Lightweight boxers
Light-welterweight boxers
Super-featherweight boxers
Welterweight boxers
Jamaican male boxers
Sportspeople from Kingston, Jamaica
20th-century Jamaican people
21st-century Jamaican people